Cabarrus County Schools is a local education agency headquartered in Concord, North Carolina. The system presides over the vast majority of Cabarrus County, North Carolina, the exception being an area of Kannapolis in the northern part of the county that operates its own district. Over 33,000 students are enrolled in Cabarrus County Schools, and the school system has over 4,300 employees. The current superintendent is Dr. John Kopicki, who was the Cabarrus County Board of Education announced as superintendent at its Work Session on Monday, August 2.

Schools

Traditional K-12 schools
The following lists the high schools of the system, including their feeder elementary and middle schools. Some exceptions to the following diagram exist, but this depiction is typically accurate.
(Note: high schools are grades 9–12; middle schools 6–8; and elementary schools K-5)

Concord High School, 1895 (Spiders)
Concord Middle School
Harold Winkler Middle School (2011) "(split)"
Beverly Hills Elementary School
Coltrane-Webb STEM Elementary School
R. Brown McAllister Elementary School
Royal Oaks Elementary School
W.M. Irvin Elementary School
Mount Pleasant High School, 1928 (Tigers)
Mount Pleasant Middle School
Mount Pleasant Elementary School
 W.M. Irvin Elementary School
Central Cabarrus High School, 1966 (Vikings)
C.C. Griffin Middle School
J.N. Fries Middle School
A.T. Allen Elementary School
Bethel Elementary School
Rocky River Elementary School
Wolf Meadow Elementary School
Northwest Cabarrus High School, 1966 (Trojans)
Northwest Cabarrus Middle School
Charles E. Boger Elementary School (2007)
Weddington Hills Elementary School (split)
Winecoff Elementary School
W.R. Odell Elementary School
Jay M. Robinson High School, 2001 (Bulldogs)
Harold Winkler Middle School (2011) "(split)"
Furr Elementary School (2007)
Pitts School Road Elementary School
Wolf Meadow Elementary School
Weddington Hills Elementary School (split)
Hickory Ridge High School, 2007 (Raging Bulls)
C.C. Griffin Middle School
Hickory Ridge Middle School (2010)
Pitts School Road Elementary School (split)
Rocky River Elementary School
Patriots Elementary School
Harrisburg Elementary School
Cox Mill High School, 2009 (Chargers)
Harris Road Middle School (split)
Cox Mill Elementary School (2002)
W.R. Odell Elementary School (first established in 1929)
West Cabarrus High School, 2020 (Wolverines)

Non-traditional schools
Opportunity School – Glenn Center (alternative school)
Mary Frances Wall Center
Cabarrus-Kannapolis Early College High School
Cabarrus Early College of Technology High School
Performance Learning Center
Lockhart Early Learning Center
Cabarrus Virtual Academy

J.N. Fries Middle School 

J.N. Fries Middle School is a magnet school in the Cabarrus County Schools system. It offers a STEM program.

History 
J.N. Fries opened in 1990 with a designed capacity of 900 students. It was a traditional middle school named after the late Dr. Joseph Nelson Fries. He served as CCS superintendent from 1977 to 1988 and led the county through many transitions. By 1995, the school had over 1,230 students. The original middle school fed into Central Cabarrus High and at its peak (before it became a magnet) had 1,542 students. The mascot was named the Knight, often referred to as the Noble Knight. It has been named a School of Distinction for many years in North Carolina.

In the 2011–2012 school year, J.N. Fries reopened as a magnet school, housing the STEM and International Studies programs. Since then, students residing in Cabarrus County can apply to attend J.N. Fries. Those who meet the academic requirements are then placed into a lottery if there are no slots currently available.

Principals 
The stem school (after its reopening) has been headed by four principals:
 Dr. Kecia Coln
 Dr. Jim Williams
 Kristy Bullock
Sherry Lee(before she served at harris road elementary)

The current STEM Coach is Megan Charlton. The current Assistant Principals are Micah Thompson and Germeka Ugandapo.

Clubs 
Several different clubs are offered at J.N. Fries, including FBLA, Arts and Crafts, Battle of the Books, Honor Band, Open Gym, Community Service, and many more.

Dr. Joseph Nelson Fries 
Dr. Fries was born Aug. 16, 1927 in Rowan County, to the late Joseph Abram (Jack) Fries and Nellie Penley Fries. He graduated from Boyden High School, earned his bachelor's degree from Catawba College, completed his master's studies at Appalachian State University, and received his advanced administration certificate from the University of North Carolina at Chapel Hill. He was awarded his doctorate degree in education from Duke University. During World War II, he voluntarily served in the United States Army, Btry. B 3rd BN. 1st Regt. R.T.C. final station, Okinawa, Japan.

His uncle Channing Hilliard Fries, Jr. first hired him as a teacher and coach in Nashville. After moving to Concord, he taught sixth grade at Clara Harris School. He served as the first principal of Beverly Hills School from 1954 to 1965. Dr. Fries devoted over 39 years of his professional career to public education in North Carolina, having served as superintendent of Cabarrus County Schools from 1977 to 1988. Dr. Fries was a member of numerous professional organizations and boards, including the Cabarrus County Fair Board and the Rotary Club. He served as president of the North Carolina Association of School Administrators, the Concord Kiwanis Club, and the Cabarrus County Retired School Personnel of NCAE. He encouraged everyone to continue their education. Following his retirement, J.N. Fries Middle School was named to honor his commitment to the children of Cabarrus County.

Growth 

As the population of Cabarrus County has exploded over the past fifteen years, so too has the size of the school system. In 2001 the county opened Jay M. Robinson High School, the first new high school in Cabarrus County in 35 years. However, new schools at all three levels tend to become quickly overcrowded (Robinson High School, built for 1,500 students, opened in the fall of 2005 with nearly 1,800 students enrolled). Therefore, new schools are being constantly planned and added, with eight new schools having been constructed since 1996 (plus four new buildings for outdated existing schools). The 2016–17 school year saw an opening of another new elementary school, the Odell 3–5 building (Odell Elementary School), which was constructed on the old Odell site. The Odell already in place will become the K-2 building and will be called Odell Primary School. Two new schools are scheduled to open in the 2020–2021 school year, West Cabarrus High School as well as Hickory Ridge Elementary School.

Soccer partnership 
Since 2005 FC Carolina Alliance Youth Soccer Club has served as the administrator for Cabarrus County Schools Middle School Soccer League. FCCA provides the venue, schedule, uniforms, coaches, referees, and end-of-season awards for a successful middle school soccer program. 
The program is open to all middle school boys and girls.
Each school may enter a maximum of two teams in the boy's league, and two teams in the girl's league. (If a school is only able to form a co-ed team then that team will play in the boys division.)
The program is run in a league format with an end-of-season play off tournament. Each team plays between 8–12 games, depending on their play-off results. The partnership with FCCA was terminated in 2014.

FCCA also works with Cabarrus County School's "Kid's Plus" after-school program, providing free soccer clinics to Cabarrus County elementary schools.

See also
Cabarrus County, North Carolina
Kannapolis City Schools
List of school districts in North Carolina

Notes

References

External links
Cabarrus County Schools
Cabarrus County Schools' ABC's Report Card
http://www.fccasoccer.com
 J.N. Fries Official Website

Education in Cabarrus County, North Carolina
School districts in North Carolina
School districts established in 1970
1970 establishments in North Carolina
Magnet schools